The Journal of Veterinary Science is a scientific journal covering animal health.

Publications established in 2000
Veterinary medicine journals
Open access journals

The Journal of Veterinary Science (JVS) is an international, peer-reviewed, open access journal of veterinary medicine published bimonthly in English. The Journal’s publisher is the Korean Society of Veterinary Science. The JVS aims to publish evidence-based, scientific research articles from various disciplines within veterinary medicine. The Journal welcomes original articles of general and/or global interest to readers in the veterinary medicine and related fields.

The JVS covers scientific and technological aspects of major veterinary medical sciences such as veterinary biomedical sciences, veterinary pathobiology and preventive medicine, veterinary public health, veterinary clinical sciences, veterinary humanities and social sciences.

Article category: The JVS publishes original articles, review articles, rapid communications, case reports, guidelines and recommendations, perspectives, letters to the editor, and editorials.